Izaac Stubblety-Cook  (born 4 January 1999) is an Australian swimmer. He is the world record holder in the long course 200 metre breaststroke.

In 2021, Stubblety-Cook competed in the men's 100m and 200m breaststroke events at the 2020 Summer Olympics in Tokyo, winning a gold medal (and setting an Olympic record) in the latter event. He swam the breaststroke leg in the mixed 4x100m relay in which Australia finished 3rd, winning a bronze medal.  He trains under Vince Raleigh at the Chandler Aquatic Centre, Brisbane, Queensland.

Career
Stubblety-Cook started swimming at Wellers Hill Water Ratz, a swimming club in Tarragindi, Queensland. His reason for joining was to participate in the swim program for general water safety. Stubblety-Cook then competed in the heats of the 200m breaststroke.at the 2018 Commonwealth Games, He then competed in the men's 200 metre breaststroke at the 2019 World Aquatics Championships.

He won his first international medal, a silver medal, in the 200m breaststroke, at the 2018 Pan Pacific Championships in Tokyo. He continued to impress at the 2021 Australian Swimming National Championships, taking out two national titles in the 100m breaststroke and 200m breaststroke.

In the 2022 Australia Day Honours Stubblety-Cook was awarded the Medal of the Order of Australia.

At the 2022 Australian Swimming Championships, held in May in Adelaide, he qualified for the 2022 World Aquatics Championships and 2022 Commonwealth Games in the 100 metre breaststroke and 200 metre breaststroke, setting a new world record in the 200 metre breaststroke in the final with a time of 2:05.95 to break the former record of 2:06.12 set by Anton Chupkov of Russia in 2019.

World records

Long course metres

Olympic records

Long course metres

References

External links
 

1999 births
Living people
Australian male breaststroke swimmers
Swimmers from Brisbane
Recipients of the Medal of the Order of Australia
Swimmers at the 2020 Summer Olympics
Medalists at the 2020 Summer Olympics
Olympic gold medalists for Australia
Olympic gold medalists in swimming
Olympic bronze medalists for Australia
Olympic bronze medalists in swimming
Olympic swimmers of Australia
Sportsmen from Queensland
World Aquatics Championships medalists in swimming
Swimmers at the 2018 Commonwealth Games
Swimmers at the 2022 Commonwealth Games
Commonwealth Games medallists in swimming
Commonwealth Games gold medallists for Australia
Commonwealth Games silver medallists for Australia
21st-century Australian people
Medallists at the 2022 Commonwealth Games